Elise Clay Bennett Smith (September 9, 1871 – 1964), President of the Kentucky Equal Rights Association from 1915–1916, also served as an Executive Committee member for the National American Woman Suffrage Association. Her last name changed several times as she married three men in succession: from her birth surname of Bennett she became Smith, then Jefferson, and finally Gagliardini.

Early life, first marriage, and motherhood
Elise "Fanny" Clay Bennett was the second of six children of suffragists Sarah "Sallie" Lewis Clay Bennett (daughter of Mary Jane Warfield Clay) and James Bennett of Madison County, Kentucky.  She was also the niece of several nationally known activists, including Mary Barr Clay, Laura Clay, and Belle Harris Bennett. She graduated from the University of Michigan in Ann Arbor, Michigan.

She married Thomas Jefferson Smith, Jr. (July 6, 1867 - October 10, 1916) of Madison County, Kentucky, on February 3, 1898. They had two children together: Elise Bennett Smith Wenley and Thomas Jefferson Smith, Jr.

By 1900, the Smiths were renting a house on Fourth Street in Richmond, Kentucky, while he worked as a lawyer. Elise was a housekeeper and taking care of their baby daughter, Elise (13 July 1899 - 1 September 1986). Their son Thomas Jefferson Smith (2 April 1904 - 3 November 1944) was also born in Madison County, Kentucky.

In 1912 the family moved to Frankfort, Kentucky since her husband had been appointed to a four-year post as a State Banking Commissioner which oversaw regulations of banking. As the niece of the widower Kentucky Governor James B. McCreary, she served as the hostess of gatherings at the executive mansion at Frankfort. She also served as the chairman of the promotion committee for the "Woman's Shop" at the Kentucky State Fair in Louisville in September 1915.

After her first husband died, she moved with her two children (Elise was 30 and Thomas 15) to a high society neighborhood of the St. James–Belgravia Historic District in Louisville, Kentucky, renting an apartment at Saint James Court. She was financially stable, holding stock in the Clay's Ferry Bridge Company.

Club and Suffrage Activities

1912
Elise Bennett Smith, a member of the Daughters of the American Revolution, was elected President of Federation of Women's Clubs in Kentucky.

Confident of the Kentucky legislature in early 1912 passing school suffrage for Kentucky women (with educational qualification), she would start planning a campaign for full suffrage thereafter.

1913
She was appointed chairman of Kentucky Day at the National Conservation Exposition in Knoxville, Tennessee. She was also invited as a delegate to the fourth American Peace Congress, held at St. Louis, Missouri in May.

1914
Smith served as a founding member of the Woman's Forward Kentucky Movement, a campaign to support Cora Wilson Stewart's Illiteracy Commission and combat adult illiteracy in Kentucky.

1915
Still serving in the role of First Lady of Kentucky, Smith organized the Cotton Ball at the Capital Hotel in Frankfort, Kentucky as a fundraiser for the Kentucky Equal Rights Association (KERA) in February. In November at the KERA convention, she was elected president.

1916
As KERA president she recruited Senator Thomas A. Combs of Lexington to introduce a full suffrage bill in the Kentucky Senate; and, working from the McClure Building in Frankfort, Kentucky together with former KERA president Madeline McDowell Breckinridge she managed the distribution of literature to legislators on suffrage.

Smith invited suffragist Beatrice Forbes-Robertson Hale to speak on January 18, 1916, in the Kentucky Assembly. The legislature adjourned at noon to hear Hale speak and the galleries filled with women wearing sashes with "Votes for Women." Smith invited the Governor Augustus Owsley Stanley to attend. However, the Governor actively worked against the campaign, even as the bill for woman suffrage in Kentucky passed the Senate, and the bill died.

Smith was meanwhile elected state chairman of the Political Science Department of the Federation of Women's Clubs of Kentucky.

Her regional and national standing was strengthened when she presented at "Dixie Night" at the National American Woman Suffrage Association NAWSA convention in Atlantic City on September 7. She was being considered for NAWSA first auditor but was elected NAWSA corresponding secretary instead.

Carrie Chapman Catt chose for the new headquarters for NAWSA a historic home at 1626 Rhode Island Ave. NW owned by Mrs. Christian Hemmick; and Catt planned for Smith to live there as a member of the NAWSA Executive Board assigned to the work of local organization. Her daughter Elise joined her there as she worked at the NAWSA national headquarters. Smith and Laura Clay represented Kentucky at the Susan B. Anthony memorial program at the NAWSA headquarters.

1917
Smith had stepped down as president in order to live in Washington and work for NAWSA. When she moved back to Kentucky, she stayed active in organizing the woman suffrage campaign by serving as the KERA corresponding secretary.

Leaving Politics Behind
In the summers of 1920 and 1922, she and her two children, daughter Elise and son Thomas Jr., traveled throughout Europe for the purpose of "recreation and education." On the ship over to Europe she met George David Jefferson of London - she was on her way to France to undertake "reconstruction work in the  regions of France under the direction of Miss Anna Morgan, of New York."

On November 25, 1920, she married George David Jefferson (March 26, 1863 - July 1932) a retired secretary (age 58), of Oxford, England. Jefferson was originally from Hamilton, Ontario, Canada and had worked in Ayer, Massachusetts as the school secretary at Groton School. They were lived with his daughter Miss R.M. Jefferson in London and traveled to the U.S. often. While living in England, they also traveled to Italy in 1923 and Algeria in 1925. They had settled in Rome, Italy when they left in December 1930 to live at 380 Riverside Drive, New York, New York. George Jefferson died in England in July 1932.

At the age of 66 and with her brother Warfield C. Bennett as a witness, she married an Italian investment broker, Alessandro Gagliardini (February 21, 1903 - May 1966) on January 15, 1938, in Manhattan, New York; and, he petitioned for his naturalization papers that day. They lived at 1212 Fifth Avenue in New York, New York. They often traveled to Italy where they would stay half the year.

Death
She died in New York on August 25, 1964, and her body was brought back to Richmond, Kentucky where she is buried.

See also
Kentucky Equal Rights Association
National American Woman Suffrage Association

References

Resources
 Kentucky Equal Rights Association. Report of the Twenty-Fourth Annual Convention of the Kentucky Equal Rights Association Held at Louisville, Kentucky November 20, 21, and 22, 1913.. Laura Clay Papers, University of Kentucky Special Collections Research Center, Lexington, Kentucky.
 Kentucky Equal Rights Association. Report of the Twenty-fifth Annual Convention of the Kentucky Equal Rights Association, Held at Owensboro, Kentucky November 6, 7 and 8, 1914. Laura Clay Papers, University of Kentucky Special Collections Research Center, Lexington, Kentucky.
 Kentucky Equal Rights Association. Report of the Twenty-Sixth Annual Convention of the Kentucky Equal Rights Association Held at Lexington, Kentucky November 8, 9 and 10, 1915.  Laura Clay Papers, University of Kentucky Special Collections Research Center, Lexington, Kentucky.
 Kentucky Equal Rights Association. Reports of the Twenty-Eighth and Twenty-Ninth Annual Conventions of the Kentucky Equal Rights Association Held at Lexington, Kentucky November 30th and December 1st, 1917 and at Louisville, Kentucky March 11th and 12th, 1919. Laura Clay Papers, University of Kentucky Special Collections Research Center, Lexington, Kentucky.
 Kentucky Equal Rights Association. Thirtieth Convention of the Kentucky Equal Rights Association. Kentucky Woman's Democratic Club papers, Box 1910–1945, University of Kentucky Special Collections Research Center, Lexington, Kentucky.
 National American Woman Suffrage Association, Susan B. Anthony and Elizabeth Cady Stanton. Proceedings of the Forty-Third Annual Convention of the National American Woman Suffrage Association, v.43-45 1911-1913. Washington, D.C.: The Association, 1893–1913. (Available online via the Hathi-Trust, https://hdl.handle.net/2027/wu.89073162133)

1871 births
1964 deaths
American suffragists
People from Richmond, Kentucky
American political activists
Women in Kentucky
Kentucky women in politics
University of Michigan alumni